Greenlaw is a surname of Scottish origin which means "a green hill." Notable people with the surname include:

Dre Greenlaw (born 1997), American football player
Jeff Greenlaw (born 1968), Canadian ice hockey player
Lavinia Greenlaw (born 1962), English poet and writer
Linda Greenlaw (born 1960), American writer

Fictional characters:
Delphi Greenlaw, character in the soap opera Shortland Street

References

Surnames of Scottish origin